Grahak Cunningham (born Stuart Cunningham, 21 May 1977) is an ultra-distance runner and motivational speaker from Perth, Western Australia.

Biography 
Cunningham grew up in Busselton, south of Perth, he did very little running. It was only when he was about 16 and stressed with school exams that his mother took him along to a meditation class.
At university, he began attending classes at a Sri Chinmoy center. He adopted the name Grahak from Sri Chinmoy (a Sanskrit word meaning "eagerness"). Already running marathons and longer distances and getting ever more deeply involved in Chinmoy's teachings, Cunningham first witnessed the New York race in 2003.

Races and results 
 2007 Bunbury 50 km Ultramarathon, 5th
 2008 Bunbury 50 km Ultramarathon, 9th
 2009 Self-Transcendence 3100-Mile Race, 2nd
 2012 Bunbury 50 km Ultramarathon, 2nd
 2012 Self-Transcendence 3100 Mile Race, 1st

References

External links 
 grahakcunningham.com
 Media Archive 
 Video : Today, 6/ 2015
 Video : Change Savvy, 1/ 2015

1977 births
Living people
Australian ultramarathon runners
Devotees of Sri Chinmoy
Athletes from Perth, Western Australia
Male ultramarathon runners
Australian male long-distance runners